The Ordnance QF 20 pounder (known as 20 pounder,  20 pdr or simply 20-pr) was a  British 84 mm (3.307 inch) tank gun. It was introduced in 1948 and used in the Centurion main battle tank, Charioteer medium tank, and Caernarvon Mark II heavy tank. After the 20 pounder gun was found to have inadequate performance against the Soviet T-54 the gun was mostly replaced in service by the larger calibre 105 mm L7 gun.

Design and development
The gun was developed by the Royal Ordnance Factories.

As fitted to the Charioteer, it ran through two models:
 Model A without a fume extractor.
 Model B with a fume extractor.

The L7 105 mm tank gun was developed from the 20 pounder. In 1954, the original version of the 105 mm was made by re-boring the tube of a 20 pounder barrel.

Service history
The gun was fitted predominantly to the Centurion tank, seeing action with British and Australian forces during the Korean and Vietnam War. When a Soviet T-54A main battle tank was driven to the British embassy in Budapest by Hungarian rebels during the Hungarian Revolution of 1956, analysis of its armour and 100 mm gun led British officials to determine that the 20 pounder was ineffective at defeating Soviet armour. This led to the development of the 105 mm L7 tank gun, which was designed to fit specifically into the turret mountings of the 20 pounder, facilitating for easily upgunning existing tanks equipped with the 20 pounder.

One 20 pounder gun was fitted to a Swiss pre-production Panzer 58, replacing a domestic 90 mm Kanone 1948 gun, before it was equipped with the 105 mm L7.

Performance
The 20 pounder's APCBC projectile had an initial muzzle velocity of 1,020 metres per second and could penetrate  of rolled homogeneous armour (RHA). However, these conventional rounds were rarely used.

At given ranges, the 20 pounder APDS Mk. III shot only had 53% of its line of sight penetration against a sloped plate, compared to at the normal. Line of sight penetration refers to a flat line drawn through a piece of sloped armour, indicating the effective thickness.

The 20-pounder could also fire high-explosive and canister shot shells.

Ammunition

Shot Mk. 1 : an Armour-Piercing Capped Ballistic Capped (APCBC) round.
APDS Mk. 1 : an Armour-Piercing Discarding Sabot round. It uses a nitrocellulose propellant (NH). The APDS Mk. 1 was fielded in 1947.
DS/T PRAC Mk. 2 : a training variant of the APDS Mk. 1, it is identifiable by the yellow band painted on its black lead sabot. It uses a cordite propellant (WM).
APDS-T Mk. 3 : an improved Armour-Piercing Discarding Sabot round fitted with tracer. The APDS-T Mk. 3 was fielded in 1950.
DS/T PRAC Mk. 4 : a training variant of the APDS-T Mk. 3 except for mild steel sabot painted black with yellow band. The DS/T PRAC Mk. 4 was fielded in 1955.
Shell Mk. 1 : an High-Explosive (HE) shell using a No. 410 Mk. 1 instantaneous fuze. The shell is painted olive drab or buff with red band and black RDX/BWX (explosive filler).
SMK BE Mk. 1 : a smoke shell filled with three internal smoke canisters ejected by a Base Ejection (BE) device.
CAN : a canister shot consisting of a black metal cylinder filled with 580 steel pellets (9.5 kg). It has an effective range of 229 m.

Footnotes

Notes

References

Bibliography
 
 .
 
 
 .

See also
 Pounds as a measure of cannon bore
 British standard ordnance weights and measurements
 Ordnance QF 32-pounder

External links

Cold War artillery of the United Kingdom
Tank guns of the United Kingdom
85 mm artillery
Weapons and ammunition introduced in 1948